William Leonard Shipp (October 16, 1929 – June 9, 2011) was a professional Canadian football player who played twelve seasons with the Canadian Football League's Montreal Alouettes and the Toronto Argonauts. During those years, he became an eastern conference all-star as an offensive tackle in 1955 and 1959 and as a defensive tackle in 1964. Shipp played all 14 regular season games every year from 1958 to 1962 except 1960 when he missed 5. As a defensive lineman, he intercepted a pass in 1961. He started his pro career in the NFL, playing one season for the New York Giants.

References

1929 births
2011 deaths
Alabama Crimson Tide football players
American players of Canadian football
Canadian football defensive linemen
Canadian football offensive linemen
Montreal Alouettes players
New York Giants players
Players of American football from Alabama
Sportspeople from Mobile, Alabama
Toronto Argonauts players